Hoopes Houtse is a historic home located at Glens Falls, Warren County, New York. Designed by Boston architect Henry Forbes Bigelow, it was built in 1904 and is a rectangular, two story, stucco residence covered by a hipped roof sheathed with wood shingles. It features Dutch Colonial Revival style design elements.

It was added to the National Register of Historic Places in 1984.

See also
 National Register of Historic Places listings in Warren County, New York

References

Houses on the National Register of Historic Places in New York (state)
Colonial Revival architecture in New York (state)
Houses completed in 1904
Houses in Warren County, New York
Dutch Colonial Revival architecture in the United States
Glens Falls, New York
National Register of Historic Places in Warren County, New York